The Ukulele Experience, Vol. One is the fourth studio album (in the U.S) by singer/songwriter Jonny Blu, released in the United States on July 20, 2012, by Dao Feng Music. It is Jonny Blu's first album of ukulele based folk and pop music and contains a mix of original songs by Jonny Blu and some pop standards.  The album was recorded in 2012 at Dao Feng Studios in Toluca Lake, California and was mixed and mastered by Myke Aaron at Soundcubed Studios in Hollywood, CA.

Track listing
"You Feel Right" – 2:43
"You Belong to Me"  – 3:11
"Because"  – 2:45
"Be My Valentine"  – 3:04
"We Belong Together (feat. Kate Micucci)"  – 3:23
"Hey Jonny, Open Your Eyes (feat. Kate Micucci)"  – 0:22
"Someone Like You"  – 3:49
"Happy Go Lucky Guy"  – 3:18
"Ooh Wee (Ukulele Version)"  – 2:54
"Over the Rainbow" – 3:13
"THGTC (Things Have Got to Change)" – 3:16
"Always Look on the Bright Side of Life" – 3:11
"Your Birthday Song (Ukulele Version)" – 2:10

Personnel

Musicians
Jonny Blu – vocals, ukulele, music arrangements, background vocals, chromatic harmonica, percussion, bongo drums, kazoo
Ryan Roberts – bass
Kate Micucci – vocals, ukulele
Skip Stellrecht – ukulele, background vocals
Bob Malone – accordion 
Jacqueline Piñol – background vocals

Production
Myke Aaron – producer, engineer, mixing
Jonny Blu – producer, engineer, mixing
Jonny Blu – artwork, photography, album package design

2012 albums
Jonny Blu albums